The Mindanao Post is a newspaper has published and edited every Wednesday with general circulation in the whole Mindanao, with editorial and business address located at Blk. 16, Lot 3, SIR New Matina, Davao City.

Newspapers published in Davao City
Weekly newspapers published in the Philippines